r a d i o q u a l i a is an art collaboration by New Zealanders, Adam Hyde and Honor Harger, founded in 1998 in Australia. Since 1999 they have been based in several different countries including the Netherlands, the UK and Latvia.

r a d i o q u a l i a create broadcasts, installations, performances and online artworks. Their principal interest is how broadcasting technologies can be used to create new artistic forms, and how sound art can be used to illuminate abstract ideas.

Key works include: The Frequency Clock (1998 - 2003), Free Radio Linux (2002 – 2004), Radio Astronomy (2004 -> now)

They have exhibited at museums, galleries and festivals, including: NTT ICC, Tokyo; New Museum, New York; Gallery 9, Walker Art Center, USA; Sónar, Barcelona; Ars Electronica festivals, Linz, Austria; Experimental Art Foundation, Australia; Maison Europeenne de la Photographie, Paris; and the Physics Room, New Zealand.

In August 2004 they were joint winners of a UNESCO Digital Art Prize (second place) for Radio Astronomy.

References 

Byrne C (2005), "net.radio and streaming audio", paper for  Looking Glass lectures at OKNO, Norway, Saturday 18 June 2005, published online: 
Viewed 6 March 2007

Flor M (2002), "Hear me out: Free Radio Linux broadcasts the Linux sources on air and online", Published on Netartcommons, March 2002:

Viewed 5 May 2007

Ludovico A (2005), "Streaming Culture, Radioqualia interview", Neural 23 magazine, Italy. 
Reference: 
Viewed 25 April 2007

Perron J (2003),  "radioqualia", la foundation Daniel Langlois website biography, Published online: 
Viewed 20 March 2007

Tribe M (2006), "r a d i o q u a l i a - Free Radio Linux", Brown University Wiki, Published online: 
Viewed 25 April 2007

Tribe M and Jana R, New Media Art, Taschen, 2006. .

Related pages 

New media art
Electronic art

External links 

r a d i o q u a l i a

Computer art
Digital art
Radio organizations